China Pond is a lake in Putnam County, in the U.S. state of New York.

According to tradition, China Pond was named from an incident after a woman tossed chinaware into it in order to anger her drunk husband.

References

Landforms of Putnam County, New York
Ponds of New York (state)